Robert Desharnais (born March 29, 1955) is an American evolutionary biologist. His research area is population biology and ecology.

Education 

Desharnais studied biology at the University of Massachusetts, Boston, earning a Bachelor of Arts degree in 1976. At the University of Rhode Island, in 1979, he earned a Master of Science degree in zoology, and in 1982 he received a Doctor of Philosophy degree in zoology. His doctoral advisor was the population geneticist Robert F. Constantino.

Career 

After finishing his graduate studies, from 1982 to 1983, he was a postdoctoral fellow at Dalhousie University. From 1985 to 1987, he was a research associate at Rockefeller University, and from 1987 to 1988, he was an assistant professor] In 1988, he moved to Los Angeles, California to work as an assistant professor at California State University, Los Angeles, and in 1997, there he became full professor.

Research 

Some of his research interests are theoretical biology, nonlinear population dynamics, chaos theory in population ecology, and the role of natural selection in population dynamics.

Publications
Desharnais is the author or editor of three books and over 50 articles including:

 Population Dynamics and Laboratory Ecology

References 

1955 births
Living people
California State University, Los Angeles faculty
Evolutionary biologists
Rockefeller University faculty
University of Massachusetts Boston alumni
University of Rhode Island alumni